Garry Hoy  (January 28, 1954 – July 9, 1993) was a lawyer for the law firm of Holden Day Wilson in Toronto who died when he fell from the 24th floor of his office building in Toronto. In an attempt to prove to a group of prospective articling students that the glass windows of the Toronto-Dominion Centre were unbreakable, he threw himself against the glass. The glass did not break when he hit it, but the window frame gave way and he fell to his death.

Background
Garry Hoy was a corporate and securities law specialist in Toronto. While giving a tour of the Toronto-Dominion Centre to a group of articling students, Hoy attempted to demonstrate the strength of the structure's window glass by slamming himself into a window. He had apparently performed this stunt many times in the past, having previously bounced harmlessly off the glass. After one attempt which saw the glass hold up, Hoy tried once more. In this instance, the force of Hoy slamming into the window removed the window from its frame, causing the entire intact window and Hoy to fall from the building. This occurred in a small conference room adjacent to a boardroom where a reception was being held for new articling students.

Structural engineer Bob Greer was quoted by the Toronto Star as saying "I don’t know of any building code in the world that would allow a 160-pound (72.5 kg) man to run up against a glass and withstand it." In another interview, the firm's spokesman mentioned that the glass, in fact, did not break, but popped out of its frame, leading to Hoy's fatal plunge.

Hoy's death contributed to the closing of Holden Day Wilson in 1996, which at the time was the largest law firm closure in Canada.

In popular culture
Hoy's experience was featured in numerous television shows, including MythBusters and 1000 Ways to Die (in the episode "Unforced Errors").

See also
List of unusual deaths

References

1993 deaths
1955 births
Accidental deaths from falls
Accidental deaths in Ontario
Deaths by defenestration
Deaths by person in Canada
Lawyers in Ontario
20th-century Canadian lawyers